Gordon Independent School District is a public school district based in Gordon, Texas (USA).

Located in Palo Pinto County, the district serves the city of Mingus and extends into a small portion of northern Erath County. Gordon ISD was rated Exemplary by the Texas Education Agency in 2009 making it the only K-12 district in the county with the high honor. Gordon High School won the 1996 and 1999 UIL six-man football championship.

In 2009, the school district was rated "exemplary" by the Texas Education Agency.

History
The Gordon Independent School District was organized in 1882 and began as a one-room school. Miss Mollie Shelton was the school's first teacher.

The district changed to a four-day school week in fall 2019.

Athletics
Gordon High School plays six-man football.

See also

List of school districts in Texas

References

External links
Gordon ISD

School districts in Palo Pinto County, Texas
School districts in Erath County, Texas
School districts established in 1882